FabricLive.10 is a DJ mix compilation album by Fabio, as part of the FabricLive Mix Series.

Track listing
  Calibre - Venus & Mars - Creative Source
  J Majik feat. Kathy Brown - Share The Blame - Infrared
  Total Science - Squash - CIA Records
  Calibre - ReJack - Creative Source
  J Majik feat. Kathy Brown - Tell Me (Twisted Individual remix) - Infrared
  Special Forces (Photek) - Miracle - Photek Productions
  Social Security - Take Away - Creative Source
  Marcus Intalex, ST Files & High Contrast - 3 A.M. - SOUL:R
  Danny C - The Mexican (Instrumental) - Dread
  Bebel Gilberto - So Nice [Summer Samba](DJ Marky & XRS mix) - WEA
  Influx Datum - Dayz Of Glory - Formation
  Funk 'N' Flex - Flow With Me - Defunked
  High Contrast - Savoir Faire - Hospital/Tongue & Grrove
  A Sides feat. Singing Fats & Regina - What U Don't Know - Eastside
  Danny C - Ace Face - Creative Source

References

External links
Fabric: FabricLive.10
Allmusic: [ FabricLive.10 review]
Resident Advisor: FabricLive.10 review

2003 compilation albums